Theurer is a surname. Notable people with the surname include:

 Dave Theurer, American game designer and computer programmer
 Elisabeth Theurer (born 1956), Austrian equestrian
 Michael Theurer (born 1967), German politician
 Peter Theurer (born 1969), Swiss sailor
. Harold Eric Theurer (born 2002) founder of City Ledge Studios